Saint Ann Catholic Church in Kaneohe is a parish of the Roman Catholic Church of Hawaii in the United States.  Located in Kaneohe on the island of Oahu, the church falls under the jurisdiction of the Diocese of Honolulu and its bishop.  It is named after Saint Ann.

History 

During the persecution of Catholics in Hawaii (circa 1849), many natives fled from Honolulu over the Pali trail to the windward side and settled in the Koolau area. Father Robert Walsh, SS.CC (the same community as that of Father Damien of Molokai) began ministering to the Catholics. In 1841, Father Robert Martial Janvier, SS.CC. replaced Fr. Walsh and centered the mission in the Heeia area.

Parish tradition has it that a village chief had gone to a Protestant Missionary asking for lamp oil. The missionary could not give him any oil. The chief then went to the Catholic mission (at that time located at Mokapu Point) and received his oil. In gratitude, the chief gave the missionaries a piece of property.

From the Church's very beginning in 1841, the missionaries established classes for the children in the district. At first, these classes were instructions about the Catholic faith; very quickly they included reading, writing, arithmetic, and a little geography.

In 1871, a boarding school was established for eight boys by Fr. Mattias Limburg, SS.CC. The following year, 1872, a regular day school was started for boys and girls.

The McCabe family was instrumental in running the school until the arrival of the Maryknoll Sisters in 1927.

In 1960, St. Ann's School extended its curriculum to include a high school.  The high school closed in 1969.

In 1988, the administration of St. Ann's School saw the need to provide quality child care coupled with an opportunity to prepare younger children for our own kindergarten. Twenty years later, on September 11, 1989, the Early Learning Center opened in the renovated building once used for the high school and has established itself as the feeder to the school.

In 1994, 2000 and again in 2006, St. Ann's Schools was granted a six-year accreditation certificate from the Western Association of Schools and Colleges (WASC) and the Western Catholic Education Association (WCEA).  The ELC was the first preschool in the state of Hawaii to be accredited by both organizations.

Today, the School has grades one through eight. The Early Learning Center program cares for three-, four- and five-year-olds.

External links
 Official site

Ann in Kaneohe
Religious buildings and structures in Honolulu County, Hawaii
1841 establishments in Hawaii